TSA is a Polish hard rock and heavy metal band.

The band formed in 1979 in Opole as an initiative of guitarist Andrzej Nowak. The original line-up additionally included Stefan Machel (guitar), Janusz Niekrasz (bass) and Marek Kapłon (drums). TSA was originally an instrumental band. It won a "battle of the bands" during the 1981 Jarocin Festival at which members met Marek Piekarczyk, a singer in Sektor A. He debuted as TSA's vocalist a month later at the Pop Session festival in Sopot.

The band's song "Zwierzenia kontestatora" ("Confessions Of A Contestant") appears in the musical documentary Behind the Iron Curtain, which documents the heavy metal band Iron Maiden's first visit to Poland and other countries in Eastern Europe. The song is used as background music during the scene filmed in the music club Remont.

TSA's song "Marsz wilków" ("The Marching Of The Wolves") is used in the 1983 Polish children's movie Akademia Pana Kleksa (Academy of Mr. Kleks) – a film based on Jan Brzechwa's 1964 book.

The group disbanded on the eve of the 1990s, but came back together in the spring of 2001 to record and perform a 'classical line-up' of music.

As is common of heavy metal bands with acronym-based names, "TSA" may have no meaning, although in a 2003 press release one of the founders claimed that the acronym originally meant "Tajne Stowarzyszenie Abstynentów" – "Teetotallers' Secret Association".

In 2018, the band suspended its activities.
In May 2021, there was a reactivation with the core of the team supplemented by Zbyszek Kraszewski and Paweł Mąciwoda.

Members
 Current line-up
Marek Piekarczyk − lead vocals (1981–1989, 1991–1992, 1998–1999, 2001–present)
Stefan Machel − guitar, backing vocals (1980–1989, 2001–present)
Paweł Mąciwoda − bass guitar (1998–1999, 2021–present)
Zbigniew Kraszewski − drums, backing vocals  (1984–1989, 2021–present)

 Former members
Andrzej Nowak (†2022) − guitar (1979–1983, 1987–1989, 1991–1992, 1998–1999, 2001–2022)
Janusz Niekrasz − bass guitar, backing vocals (1980–1989, 2001–2018)
Marek Kapłon − drums (1980, 1981–1983, 2001–2018)
Paweł Stompór − guitar (1991–1992)
Marek Raduli − guitar (1980)
Antoni Degutis − guitar (1984–1986, 1998–1999)
Ryszard Petelnik − guitar (1980)
Andrzej Walczak − bass guitar (1991–1992)
Tomasz Zatwarnicki − bass guitar (1979)
Dariusz Biłyk − drums (1991–1992)
Duane Cleveland − drums (1998–1999; US citizen, only non-Polish member in band history)
Leszek Wojtas − drums (1980)

 TSA-Evolution line-up
Janusz Pyzowski − lead vocals (1990–1992)
Stefan Machel − guitar (1990–1992)
Piotr Łukaszewski − guitar (1990–1992)
Janusz Niekrasz − bass guitar (1990–1992)
Zbigniew Kraszewski − drums (1990–1992)

Discography

References

External links

 

Polish heavy metal musical groups
Musical groups established in 1979
1979 establishments in Poland
Metal Mind Productions artists